Oliver Koenig (born 31 January 1981) is a German sprinter and long jumper.

As a sprinter he finished eighth in the 200 metres in the 2002 IAAF World Cup. In the long jump he competed at the 2006 European Championships without reaching the final.

His personal best jump is 8.01 metres, achieved in June 2006 in Regensburg. He has 20.98 seconds in the 200 metres and 10.32 seconds in the 100 metres.

Achievements

References

1981 births
Living people
German male sprinters
German male long jumpers